The 2017 ATP Lyon Open (also known as the Open Parc Auvergne-Rhône-Alpes Lyon) was a men's tennis tournament that was played on outdoor clay courts. It was the 1st edition of the Lyon Open and part of the ATP World Tour 250 series of the 2017 ATP World Tour. It took place in the city of Lyon, France, from May 21 through May 27, 2017.

Andrés Molteni and Adil Shamasdin won the title, defeating Marcus Daniell and Marcelo Demoliner in the final, 6–3, 3–6, [10–5].

Seeds

Draw

Draw

External links
 Main draw

Lyon Open – Doubles
2017 Doubles
2017 in French tennis